Jan Dąbski (10 April 1880 in Kukizów, Galicia – 5 June 1931 in Warsaw, Poland) was a Polish politician.

Founder of Polish People's Party "Piast" (PSL Piast) in 1913. He was the chief negotiator for Poland at the peace negotiations in Riga after the Polish-Soviet war (1920–1921). Minister of Foreign Affairs of Poland in 1921. Deputy to Polish parliament (Sejm) until 1930, he was also an important politician in the PSL peasant party factions (PSL Piast, PSL Jedność Ludowa, Polish People's Party "Wyzwolenie", Stronnictwo Chłopskie).

1880 births
1931 deaths
People from Lviv Oblast
People from the Kingdom of Galicia and Lodomeria
Polish People's Party "Piast" politicians
Stronnictwo Chłopskie politicians
People's Party (Poland) politicians
Ministers of Foreign Affairs of the Second Polish Republic
Deputy Marshals of the Sejm of the Second Polish Republic
Members of the Legislative Sejm of the Second Polish Republic
Members of the Sejm of the Second Polish Republic (1922–1927)
Members of the Sejm of the Second Polish Republic (1928–1930)
Members of the Sejm of the Second Polish Republic (1930–1935)
Polish legionnaires (World War I)
University of Lviv alumni